The Sarah Balabagan Story is a 1997 Philippine biopic directed by Joel Lamangan. The film stars Vina Morales as Sarah Balabagan, an OFW who was sentenced to death in the United Arab Emirates for killing her employer who was attempting to rape her.

Plot
Sarah Balabagan (Vina) a 14-year old goes to work as a maid in Al Ain, United Arab Emirates or "Saudi", then an umbrella term for countries in the Middle East among Overseas Filipino Workers.

Balabagan a minor, her recruiter lied about her age so she can work abroad. Balabagan only knew about this when she was already in Dubai. She receives unsolicited sexual advancements from her employer and his family. In one episode, Balabagan killed her employer who was attempting to rape her.

She was put on trial and was charged for manslaughter in a secular court, but the employer's family appealed who called for a death penalty for Balabagan. She was sentenced to death by an Islamic court. Her case became a publicized and the Philippine government attempted to save her from death row. Her sentenced was reduced to a year of imprisonment and 100 lashes following an appeal to the royal family.

Cast
 Vina Morales as Sarah Balabagan
 Elizabeth Oropesa as Sarah's Mother
 Robert Arevalo as Sarah's Father
 Rey Serrano as Mokammad
 Angel Baldomar as Ali
 Zandro Gatdula as Padua
 Jerome Reyes as Brando
 Irvin Era as Usman
 Marial Al-Mutawa as Samrah
 Keempee de Leon as Ahmad
 Jennifer Sevilla as Mona
 Rolando Tinio as Sarah's Grandfather
 Caridad Sanchez as Sarah's Aunt
 Renato del Prado as Sarah's Uncle
 Denise Borromeo as Bai
 Jim Pebanco as Mouraon
 Rita Avila as Amy
 Timmy Cruz as Mely
 Melissa Mendez as Helen
 Mina Bernales as Dina
 Eugene Domingo as Lucille
 Gloria Sevilla as Mommy Ines
 Cherry Pie Picache as Gina
 Pinky Amador as Carmi
 Tonia Dizon as Presentacion
 Ana Bautista as Rio
 Marie Barbacui as Maria

Production
On September 13, 1996, Vic del Rosario Jr., Teresita Cruz and Vic Jose announced that Viva Films acquired the film rights to Sarah Balabagan's story. Balabagan was initially skeptical about turning her life into a film, but later on accepted the offer after consulting her advisers and realizing the positive reception gathered by The Flor Contemplacion Story. On October 21, 1996, Vina Morales was chosen to portray Balabagan in the film, as suggested by the latter.

Release
The film's released was delayed for at least three times. It was slated to be part of the 1996 Metro Manila Film Festival, but did not make it to the cutoff. It was initially scheduled to be premiered on February 17, 1997, with the opening day to be held two days later but was delayed reportedly due to protests from the government of the United Arab Emirates.

The film's premiere was then rescheduled to March 6, 1997, but was postponed again due to protests from Muslim Screenwriters' Club who reportedly says that the film may potentially damage the public's views on the Muslim culture and traditions. Director Lamangan responded to the criticism that he was secure on the way on how he portrayed the story of Sarah Balabagan, the Middle East, and Islam and laments that Muslim critics of the film is barring a film they have never seen before. Balabagan herself together with Lamangan attended the March premiere which was cancelled in the last minute because the film didn't have a permit.

In mid-March, then-President Fidel V. Ramos postponed the showing of the film, saying it may damage the country's relationship with the UAE and it may jeopardize the efforts of the government to save another Overseas Filipino Worker, John Aquino who was sentenced to death in 1989. A retrial was called for Aquino in December 1996.

The film was finally released on October 15, 1997. Prior to that, Viva Films agreed with the government of the UAE to delete 22 scenes from the biopic in order for it to be released to theaters.

Reception
Vina Morales received three Best Actress nominations for her role as Sarah Balabagan.

References

External links
 

1997 films
Films set in the 1990s
Philippine biographical films
Philippine films based on actual events
Films based on biographies
Films set in the United Arab Emirates
Films directed by Joel Lamangan